Wallatiri (Aymara wallata snow ball, snow lump; Andean goose, -(i)ri a suffix, translated as "abundance of Andean geese" or "habitat of the Andean geese", hispanicized spelling Huallatiri) is a mountain in the Andes in Bolivia, about  high. It is located southeast of Poopó Lake in the Oruro Department, Challapata Province, Quillacas Municipality. It lies southwest of Jatun Wila Qullu.

References 

Mountains of Oruro Department